"Playing for Keeps" is a song originally recorded by Elvis Presley. Its first release on record was on January 4, 1957, on a single with "Too Much" on the other side. "Playing for Keeps" reached number 34 in the United States, while "Too Much" spent 3 weeks at number 1.

In 1959 the song was included on Elvis's album For LP Fans Only (an unusual album for Presley because all the songs on it had been already released one to almost five years prior).

Writing and recording history 
The song was written by Sun Studio house band steel guitar and bass player Stan Kesler (words and lyrics), who wrote or co-wrote five songs in total for Elvis Presley during Elvis's early career: "I'm Left, You're Right, She's Gone". "I Forgot to Remember to Forget", "Thrill of Your Life", "Playing for Keeps", "I'm a Fool (For Loving You)".

Elvis recorded it on September 1, 1956, at the Radio Recorders Studio in  Hollywood, California (at the studio sessions for RCA Victor that were held at Radio Recorders on September 1–3). The master recording of "Playing for Keeps" is a splice of two takes: take 7 with the ending from take 18.

Commercial performance and critical reception 
Preorders for the single "Too Much" / "Playing For Keeps" reached almost 500,000 copies.

Billboard picked the single "Two Much"/"Playing for Keep" for its "Spotlight" section and then (in its  January 19, 1957, issue) as one of "This Week's Best Buys":

Mike Eder states his opinion of the side "Playing for Keeps" in his book Elvis Music FAQ: All That's Left to Know About the King's Recorded Works:

Track listings 
7-inch single (RCA 47–6800, 4 January 1957)
 "Too Much"
 "Playing for Keeps"

7-inch EP Playing for Keeps  (RCA EPA 9561, Germany)
 "Playing for Keeps"
 "Too Much"
 "Wear My Ring Around Your Neck"
 "Doncha' Think It's Time"

7-inch EP All Shook Up  (RCA 75.405, France)
 "All Shook Up"
 "That's When Your Heartaches Begin"
 "Too Much"
 "Playing for Keeps"

Charts

See also 
 List of Billboard number-one singles of 1957

References

External links 
 Elvis Presley With The Jordanaires - Playing For Keeps / Too Much at Discogs at Discogs

1957 songs
Elvis Presley songs
Songs written by Stan Kesler